William C. Grimes (November 6, 1857April 8, 1931) was an American politician and businessman who had a major influence on Oklahoma politics. He most notably served as acting governor of Oklahoma Territory from November 30, 1901, to December 9, 1901. For many years, he served as chair of the Territorial Republican Committee. He also served as the territory's member of the Republican National Committee.

Early life
Grimes was born near New Lexington, Ohio on November 6, 1857 to George Washington Grimes. At the age of twenty, he moved to Nebraska where he became a newspaperman and later sheriff of Johnson County. He traveled south to participate in the Land Run of 1889 into the Unassigned Lands. He claimed land near Kingfisher, Oklahoma and established a farm. He went into real estate, enlarged his farm, built business blocks and residential areas in town, and helped to establish Kingfisher College (active from 1895 to 1922). He also became active in Republican politics.

Political career
Grimes was appointed U.S. marshal for Oklahoma Territory in 1890. During his career as marshal, which lasted until 1893, he established a sound mechanism for the enforcement of federal law.

Grimes was turned out of office by the administration of U.S. President Grover Cleveland. He continued to work in business and farming in Kingfisher. After the Republicans returned to national office, he was reinstalled in federal service. On May 12, 1901, he became territorial secretary under Governor of Oklahoma Territory William Miller Jenkins.

In 1901, William M. Jenkins was not reappointed Governor of Oklahoma Territory due to a major scandal over a state contract. Grimes became Acting Governor of Oklahoma Territory from November 30, 1901, to December 9, 1901. Although Grimes was accused of involvement in the suspect transaction, he continued to serve in the administration of Thompson Benton Ferguson until January 1906.

Later years
After serving in the Ferguson's administration, Grimes moved to Oregon and later to California. He died in Santa Monica, California on April 8, 1931.

References

External links

 Encyclopedia of Oklahoma History and Culture – Grimes, William

1857 births
1931 deaths
People from New Lexington, Ohio
Nebraska sheriffs
Burials at Inglewood Park Cemetery
Governors of Oklahoma Territory
Oklahoma Republicans
Oregon Republicans
California Republicans
United States Marshals